Diva (1979) by Daniel Odier (writing under the pseudonym Delacorta) is a crime novel set in Paris.  It was adapted into the film Diva in 1981.

Plot summary
Jules, a young man, is a motorcycle courier for RCA in Paris, and an enthusiastic fan of classical music and opera. Jules is a particular fan of Cynthia Hawkins, a beautiful American opera singer, who only performs live and has never made a recording, studio or otherwise. One day, Jules secretly records a Cynthia Hawkins concert. He shares the tape with his friend Alba, a precocious teenage beauty. Alba shares the tape with her older friend Serge Gorodish,

Serge is a successful part-time criminal in his mid-40s, who has Alba as a sort of muse. Serge realizes that the Cynthia Hawkins tape could fetch a lot of money from "pirate" record makers.

This plot becomes entangled with the fate of Nadia, a young woman employed by Saporta, who controls the largest drug cartel and prostitution ring in Paris. Nadia records a statement exposing Saporta on a cassette tape, but is pursued by Saporta's henchmen. She hides the cassette in the satchel of Jules' motorcycle.

Soon, Jules is being chased by the police, as well as gangsters, though he has no idea why. Saporta mobilizes his entire crime organization to retrieve the tape from Jules. Locating an intrepid and skilled motorcyclist in Paris is not easy. Meanwhile, there is a furious underground bidding war for the Hawkins tape.

References and external links

1979 novels
Crime novels
Novels by Daniel Odier
Works published under a pseudonym
Novels set in Paris
Swiss novels adapted into films